Jakta is a  tall mountain in the Sunnmørsalpene mountain range. It is located in the municipality of Ørsta in Møre og Romsdal county, Norway.

On August 2, 1896, the two Brits H.C. Bowen and Cecil W. Patchell became the first known people to reach the top of Jakta.

See also
List of mountains of Norway

References

External links
 westcoastpeaks.com, Trip report, many pictures

Mountains of Møre og Romsdal
Ørsta